Agios Dimitrios is a village and a community in the municipal unit Alykes, in the central part of the island Zakynthos, Greece. , its population was 531 for the village, and 615 for the community, which includes the village Drakas. Agios Dimitrios is 2 km south of Meso Gerakari, 5 km west of Vanato, 5 km southeast of Katastari and 9 km west of Zakynthos city. The village suffered great damage from the 1953 Ionian earthquake.

Population

See also
List of settlements in Zakynthos

References

External links
Agios Dimitrios at e-Zakynthos.com
Agios Dimitrios at the GTP Travel Pages

Populated places in Zakynthos